No. 128 Squadron RAF was a Royal Air Force Squadron formed to be a day bomber unit in World War I and reformed as a fighter unit in World War II.

History

Formation and World War I
No. 128 Squadron Royal Flying Corps was formed on 1 February 1918 and became a unit of the Royal Air Force, but it disbanded on 4 July 1918 having not become operational.

Reformation in World War II
The squadron reformed in 1941 from a fighter unit equipped with Hurricanes in Sierra Leone. It was disbanded in 1943 and reformed in 1944 at RAF Wyton with Mosquitos as part of the Light Night Striking Force.

Post war
From 20 September 1945 the unit was based Melsbroek, Belgium and then briefly in Germany before being disbanded upon renumbering to 14 Squadron on 31 March 1946.

Aircraft operated

References

External links

 History of No.'s 126–130 Squadrons at RAF Web
 Bomber Command history page
 Official history page on RAF.mod.uk

128
128
Military units and formations established in 1918
1918 establishments in the United Kingdom